Charles Henry Grigg Emerson (August 17, 1863 – February 18, 1919) was a lawyer and politician in Newfoundland. He represented Burgeo-La Poile from 1900 to 1904 as a Liberal and Fortune Bay from 1908 to 1919 as a People's Party member in the Newfoundland House of Assembly.

The son of John Archibald Sinclair Emerson and Jennie Bayley, he was born in St. John's and was educated at Bishop Feild College. Emerson practised law with his uncle Prescott Emerson. He was called to the Newfoundland bar in 1891. He ran unsuccessfully for a seat in the Newfoundland assembly in an 1894 by-election. He was elected to the assembly in 1900 and then was defeated when he ran for reelection in 1904 by Conservative Robert Moulton. From 1909 to 1917, he served in the dominion cabinet as a minister without portfolio. Emerson resigned his seat in the Newfoundland assembly in November 1919; he was subsequently named registrar for the Newfoundland Supreme Court.

In 1913, Emerson married Helen Louise Scott.

He died in Boston at the age of 55.

His son Frederick Rennie Emerson was a lawyer, musician and composer who played an important role in promoting the awareness of Newfoundland's cultural heritage.

References 

Members of the Newfoundland and Labrador House of Assembly
Members of the Executive Council of Newfoundland and Labrador
1863 births
1919 deaths
Bishop Feild School alumni
Government ministers of the Dominion of Newfoundland
Newfoundland Colony people